British International School in Gaza is a school located in Gaza. Admissions start in September 2016.

International schools in the State of Palestine
Schools in the Gaza Strip
2016 establishments in the State of Palestine
Educational institutions established in 2016
Primary schools in the State of Palestine
High schools in the State of Palestine